Blue Collar is a 1978 American crime drama film directed by Paul Schrader in his directorial debut. Written by Schrader and his brother Leonard, the film stars Richard Pryor, Harvey Keitel and Yaphet Kotto. The film is both a critique of union practices and an examination of life in a working-class Rust Belt enclave.

Schrader, who was a screenwriter renowned for his work on Taxi Driver (1976), recalls the shooting as being very difficult because of the artistic and personal tensions he had with the actors (including the stars themselves). Schrader has also stated that while making the film, he suffered an on-set mental breakdown, which made him seriously reconsider his career.

The film was shot in Detroit and Kalamazoo, Michigan.

Plot 
A trio of Wayne County, Michigan auto workers, two black— 32-year-old Ezekiel "Zeke" Brown from Detroit, Michigan (Pryor) and two-time ex-convict 35-year-old Sam "Smokey" James (Kotto) from Mississippi who spent time in a Michigan State Prison—and one 33-year-old white— Polish-American from Hamtramck, Michigan, Jerry Bartowski (Keitel)—are fed up with mistreatment at the hands of both management and the union brass. Smokey, a bachelor, is in debt to a loan shark over a numbers game, Jerry, a family man, works a second job as a gas station attendant to get by but still struggles to pay bills, including the orthodontics work that his daughter needs. Zeke, another family man, is in trouble with the IRS for tax evasion by filing false claims in order to improve his family's income.

During the night, Jerry and Zeke leave their families to go party at Smokey's house, with Smokey providing cocaine and women. At Smokey's house, the trio lament their financial hardships and hatch a plan to rob a safe at the American Auto Workers union headquarters. Smokey gets advice on how to crack a safe from local racketeer and loan shark Charlie T. Hernandez, who provides his expertise in exchange for a percentage of the robbed proceeds. Despite a few rough bumps, they successfully commit the caper but find only $600 in petty cash. More importantly, they also come away with a ledger which contains evidence of the union's illegal loan operations and ties to organized crime syndicates in Las Vegas, Chicago, and New York. They decide to blackmail the union with the information, especially after the union has issued a false statement claiming that over $10,000 had been robbed so they can fraudulently collect money from the insurance company.  Meanwhile, Charlie pays Smokey a visit, demanding to get his cut of the cash, but grants him a grace period of a few more weeks after Smokey pleads for more time. Shortly afterwards, Charlie gets busted by the police for his connection to an unrelated crime and attempts to negotiate a softer conviction in exchange for revealing information about the trio's theft and their blackmail attempt. This information subsequently gets back to the union and they begin to retaliate strongly against the three friends. Jerry experiences a near-miss one evening when a pair of hired thugs show up at his house to attack his wife, but both get intercepted and roughed up by Smokey. The next day at work, Smokey is killed after being trapped in one of the paint repair booths of the factory, unable to turn off the overhead sprayers and succumbing to the poisonous paint fumes. Although Smokey's death is covered up as a work accident caused by negligent enforcement of safety rules, Zeke and Jerry realize it was a murder coordinated by the union bosses due to the incriminating knowledge they possess against the union. Jerry sends his family out of town to stay with relatives in Manistee, Michigan to keep them out of harm's way.

An FBI agent, John Burrows, who has been investigating the union, attempts to coerce Jerry into becoming a material witness or cooperating witness against the union's corruption, which would make him an adversary of his co-workers and give him a reputation as a cowardly snitch. At the same time, corrupt AAW Union leader, Eddie Johnson, convinces Zeke to give back their stolen ledger and work for them with promises of a promotion to shop steward and increased pay. Zeke, encouraged by the possibility of new opportunities & changing the system from within, decides not to seek justice for Smokey's murder, as it would jeopardize his newfound standing within the ranks of the union. Jerry attempts to convince Zeke to avenge Smokey's death, but Zeke rebukes him, telling Jerry that nothing will bring Smokey back and that they should just move forward.  One evening, two gunmen, hired by the mob, follow and try to shoot Jerry in a drive-by shooting while they're traveling through a tunnel.  This evolves into a chase where Jerry attempts to make a desperate break for Canada via the Detroit–Windsor tunnel. However, he ends up crashing his car before he gets there, and is arrested by the police. Disgusted with Zeke's capitulation and terrified after another attempt on his life, Jerry decides to contact John Burrows and cooperates with the FBI and a United States Congress Select or special committee (United States Congress).

In the end, as Jerry enters the plant with federal agents, Zeke confronts him. Once friends, Jerry and Zeke now turn on each other as a heated discussion escalates into the two attempting to physically attack each other. The movie ends with a voice-over of Smokey's earlier speech about how big corporate divides workers against one another:

They pit the lifers against the new boys, the young against the old, the black against the white. Everything they do is to keep us in our place.

Cast 
 Richard Pryor as Ezekiel "Zeke" Brown
 Harvey Keitel as Jerry Bartowski
 Yaphet Kotto as Sam "Smokey" James
 Ed Begley Jr. as Bobby Joe
 Harry Bellaver as Eddie Johnson
 George Memmoli as Jenkins
 Lucy Saroyan as Arlene Bartowski
 Lane Smith as Clarence Hill
 Cliff DeYoung as John Burrows
 Borah Silver as "Dogshit" Miller
 Chip Fields as Caroline Brown
 Harry Northup as Hank
 Leonard Gaines as Mr. Berg, IRS Man
 Milton Selzer as Sumabitch
 Sammy Warren as Barney
 Jimmy Martinez as Charlie T. Hernandez

Production 
The film was shot on location at the Checker plant in Kalamazoo, Michigan and at locales around Detroit, including the Ford River Rouge Complex on the city's southwest side and the MacArthur Bridge to Belle Isle.

The three main actors did not get along and were continually fighting throughout the shoot. The tension became so great that at one point Richard Pryor (supposedly in a drug-fueled rage) pointed a gun at Schrader and told him that there was "no way" he would ever do more than three takes for a scene; an incident that may have triggered Schrader's nervous breakdown.

Schrader states that during the filming of one take, Harvey Keitel became so irritated by Pryor's lengthy improvisations that he flung the contents of an ashtray into the camera lens, ruining the take. Pryor and his bodyguard responded by pinning Keitel to the floor and pummeling him with their fists.

Jack Nitzsche's blues-flavored score includes "Hard Workin' Man", a collaboration with Captain Beefheart.

Reception 
Blue Collar was universally praised by critics. The film holds a 98% "Fresh" rating on the review aggregate website Rotten Tomatoes based on 42 reviews. The site's consensus states: "Paul Schrader's Blue Collar offers a searing, darkly funny indictment of labor exploitation and rampant consumerism that's fueled by the outstanding work of an excellent cast." Both Roger Ebert and Gene Siskel lauded the film; Ebert awarded the film four stars and Siskel placed the film fourth on his list of the ten best of 1978.

Filmmaker Spike Lee included the film on his essential film list "Films All Aspiring Filmmakers Must See". The New York Times placed the film on its Best 1000 Movies Ever list.

In his autobiography Born to Run, Bruce Springsteen names Blue Collar and Taxi Driver as two of his favorite films of the 1970s.

See also
Heist film

References

External links

 
 
 
 

1978 films
1978 crime drama films
American crime drama films
1970s English-language films
Films scored by Jack Nitzsche
Films directed by Paul Schrader
Films set in Detroit
Films about criticism and refusal of work
Films about the labor movement
Films shot in Michigan
Films about the working class
Films with screenplays by Paul Schrader
Universal Pictures films
African-American films
1978 directorial debut films
1970s American films